This is a list of colleges and universities in the U.S. state of Virginia.  The oldest college or university in Virginia is The College of William and Mary, founded in 1693. In 2010, the Virginia Tech Carilion School of Medicine became the newest.  The largest institution is Liberty University, with over 110,000 students.  The smallest is the graduate-only Institute for the Psychological Sciences.

The State Council of Higher Education for Virginia defines four categories of degree-granting institutions of postsecondary education: public institutions, established private institutions in good standing with a nationally recognized accrediting organization, private and out-of-state institutions requiring certification and institutions exempt from state oversight for religious reasons.  Also exempt from certification are vocational institutions supervised by other state agencies, and institutions supervised by the federal government.  All public institutions and most traditional private institutions are accredited by the Southern Association of Colleges and Schools Commission on Colleges (SACSCOC).  Other state-certified private non-religious institutions are accredited by a national organization, though a few do not have any accreditation.  Some small religious institutions do not have accreditation.

Public and established private institutions

Private and out-of-state institutions

Primarily religious institutions

Defunct institutions

See also

 Higher education in the United States
 List of college athletic programs in Virginia
 List of American institutions of higher education
 List of recognized higher education accreditation organizations
List of colleges and universities
List of colleges and universities by country

References and notes

General

Specific

Virginia

Colleges and universities